Kamran Bagheri Lankarani (born 1965) is an Iranian physician and politician who was Minister of Health and Medical Education from 2005 until 2009.

Born in 1965, he finished medical school at Shiraz University of Medical Sciences, and attained an advanced fellowship degree in Medicine from the same university. He specializes in gastroenterology.

Baqeri-Lankarani got his doctorate from Shiraz University of Medical Sciences in 1989. He received post-doctorate certificate in 1992 from the same university.
He served as a head of Shiraz Namazi Hospital (1993–94), deputy chancellor of Shiraz Medical Sciences
University (1994–1996) and manager of the university's internal medicine department (since 1996).
He then served as a member of the presiding board of Shiraz Medical System Administration (1996–2000),
secretary of Islamic Association of Fars province physicians and a member of the Islamic Society of Shiraz University Students.

References

External links
Presidential Bio
Ministry of Health page
Health Ministry of Iran

Education ministers of Iran
Living people
1965 births
Front of Islamic Revolution Stability politicians
Shiraz University alumni
Politicians from Tehran
21st-century Iranian politicians
Physicians from Tehran